Alessandro "Sandro" Mazzola (born 8 November 1942) is an Italian former professional footballer, who played as a forward or attacking midfielder for Internazionale and the Italy national team. He currently works as a football analyst and commentator on the Italian national television station RAI.

He is widely regarded as one of the greatest Italian football players of all time, and as one of the best players of his generation, due to his speed, work-rate, creativity, technical skills and eye for goal; he placed second in the 1971 Ballon d'Or. Having spent his entire 17 season career with Inter, he holds the honour of being a one-club man. With the club, he won four Serie A titles (1963, 1965, 1966 and 1971), two European Cups (1964 and 1965) and two Intercontinental Cups (1964 and 1965), also winning the Serie A top scorer award during the 1964–65 season, in which he also reached the Coppa Italia final, narrowly missing out on a treble with the club. With the Italian national side, Mazzola won the UEFA European Championship in 1968, being named to the Team of the Tournament, and reached the final of the 1970 FIFA World Cup; he also took part in the 1966 and 1974 FIFA World Cups with Italy.

He is the son of Italian footballer Valentino Mazzola, player of the Grande Torino who died in the Superga air disaster. Sandro Mazzola's younger brother, Ferruccio Mazzola, was also a footballer, who died in 2013.

Early life

Sandro Mazzola was born in Turin a few weeks after his father, Valentino Mazzola, joined Torino from Venezia. His younger brother, Ferruccio, who was named after the club president of Torino, was born two years later. Their parents divorced in 1946 but their father gained custody of Sandro, who was six years old when his father died in the Superga air disaster.

Club career
Although their father Valentino had played for Torino F.C., Sandro Mazzola and his brother Ferruccio signed for Internazionale. Unlike his younger brother, Sandro Mazzola spent his entire career with Inter, scoring 116 Serie A goals for the club in 417 league appearances. He made his Serie A debut under manager Helenio Herrera during the 1960–61 season, along with many other youngsters, against rivals Juventus on 10 June 1961, scoring his team's only goal from a penalty in a 9–1 loss; this was his only appearance of the season. Herrera had joined Inter a year earlier, from Spanish side Barcelona, along with his midfield general Luis Suárez, who would serve as Inter's main playmaker during the 1960s.

Herrera's Inter side during that period also featured Tarcisio Burgnich and Giacinto Facchetti as his fullbacks, Brazilian Jair as his winger, Mario Corso as the left midfielder, Armando Picchi as his sweeper, and Mazzola, who eventually played in the inside-right offensive position under Herrera. Together, they would transform the club into the best team in Italy, Europe, and the world during the 60s, which came to be known as Grande Inter. They were known for their infamous defensive "catenaccio" tactics and ability to score from swift and sudden counterattacks. Mazzola won four Serie A titles with Inter, including two consecutive titles in 1965 and 1966, finishing as the league's top scorer in the former season, with 17 goals, and narrowly missing out on a treble in the same year.

In 1964, Mazzola scored twice to help Inter defeat Real Madrid in the 1964 European Cup Final to help the club emulate cross-city rival Milan's feat of the previous season; he finished the tournament as the joint top scorer with seven goals. Inter defended their European title again the following season by beating Benfica in the Final. Inter were eliminated in the semi-finals of the European Cup during the 1965–66 season by eventual champions Real Madrid, while in the 1966–67 season, Inter reached their third European Cup Final, but lost 2–1 to Celtic despite Mazzola scoring the opening goal of the match from the penalty spot in the seventh minute. Mazzola also won two consecutive Intercontinental Cups with Inter in 1964 and 1965, and reached the 1964–65 Coppa Italia final, as well as managing a third-place finish in the Coppa Italia during the 1967–68 season; he reached yet another European Cup final with Inter in 1972, only to lose 2–0 to Ajax.

In 1971, following his final Serie A title and his performances in Europe, he placed second in the Ballon d'Or, behind Johan Cruyff. This was the closest he ever came to winning the award, and the first time he was shortlisted as a finalist.

Mazzola retired from professional football in the summer of 1977, having served as Inter's captain from 1970 until his retirement. By the end of his career, he had won four Serie A titles (1963, 1965, 1966 and 1971), two European Cups (1964 and 1965), two Intercontinental Cups (1964 and 1965), one European Championship (1968) and was top scorer during the 1964–65 Serie A season.

International career

Mazzola played 70 times for Italy between 1963 and 1974, scoring 22 goals. His debut for the national side was against Brazil on 12 May 1963, when he was aged only 20, and he marked the occasion by scoring a goal from a penalty. Mazzola later played for his country at the 1966 FIFA World Cup under Edmondo Fabbri, appearing in all three of Italy's group matches, and scoring in his nation's opening fixture, a 2–0 win over Chile, as Italy were eliminated in the first round; he later took part at the next two editions of the tournament with Italy. His biggest achievement with the national side came in 1968, however, when Italy won the 1968 European Championship on home soil under manager Ferruccio Valcareggi, and Mazzola was named as a member of the Team of the Tournament for his performance.

Two years later, however, although Italy arrived at the World Cup in Mexico as defending European champions, there was much turmoil within the team, as the Italian national team's coach, Valcareggi, believed that Mazzola could not play alongside the other Italian creative star player Gianni Rivera, who played in a similar position for Mazzola's rival club Milan, as it would offset the balance within the team; Mazzola was therefore chosen to start in all three of Italy's first round matches, due to his superior athleticism and work-rate. As the Italians had difficulty scoring during the group stage, and Mazzola had struggled to regain match fitness after coming down with a stomach flu, Valcareggi devised a controversial solution for the second round of the tournament, which he called the "staffetta" (relay), in order to play both players.

Mazzola, who was faster, stronger, fitter, more goal-prone, and who had the superior tactical intelligence and work-rate of the two, would start in the first half, while Rivera would come in at half time, once the opposing players began to tire. This would allow the more creative playmaker Rivera more time on the ball to dictate the tempo of the team's play. With this strategy, Italy defeated hosts Mexico in the quarter-finals, and subsequently West Germany in extra time in the semi-finals to reach the World Cup final for the first time in 32 years, in which Italy faced Brazil, led by Pelé. The match was billed as the battle between offensive and defensive football, but on game day, Valcareggi abandoned his staffetta policy at half time, with the score tied at 1–1, and decided to only use Mazzola until the very end of the match, due to the precarious physical state of several of his starting players following Italy's taxing semi-final victory. Rivera finally went into the game with only six minutes remaining, replacing Roberto Boninsegna, with Brazil leading 3–1. Two of Italy's biggest technical stars were finally united together on the pitch, where many people believed they should have been all along, but it was too late; Brazil won the match 4–1 to capture the World Cup title, their third overall.

Four years later, Valcareggi finally used the two players together at the 1974 World Cup, but the ageing Italian side underperformed and was eliminated in the first round of the tournament.

Retirement

After retiring from football, Mazzola held an executive position at Inter, between 1977 and 1984, then at Genoa.

From 1995 to 1999, he returned to work at Inter as sporting director, before being replaced by former player and teammate Gabriele Oriali. From 2000 to 2003, he worked as the sporting director of Torino.

Mazzola also worked as a commentator for Rai Sport. He holds the unique record of being the commentator of the finals of the 1982 World Cup alongside Luigi Colombo for Telemontecarlo (the first final broadcast on commercial television) and the 2006 World Cup final alongside Marco Civoli for RAI, both won by Italy.

Style of play

Mazzola is widely considered to be one of the greatest Italian football players of all time and one of the best players of his generation. A quick, talented, skilful, energetic, tactically intelligent and versatile player, he was capable of playing in several advanced positions. Known for his athleticism, defensive work-rate, and acrobatic ability in the air, he initially played as an offensive–minded central midfielder in his youth, known as the "mezzala" role in Italian, but was later primarily utilised as an inside-right under Herrera, a role in which he rose to fame, establishing himself as one of the best players in the world in his position; he was also used as a centre-forward, as a winger, as a main striker, or even as a supporting striker on occasion. In his later career, as he lost some of his speed and mobility, he was usually deployed in a more creative role as an offensive midfielder, which was aided by his passing range, vision, technique, ball skills, and close control; he was also capable of playing in a deeper midfield role, as a playmaker.

Despite occupying a more withdrawn, creative playing role for much of his career, Mazzola was also known to be a prolific goalscorer as a forward, due to his eye for goal, and his powerful and accurate striking ability from both inside and outside the area, as well as his ability to time his attacking runs and get on the end of his teammates' passes, which enabled him to win the Serie A top scorer award in 1965. However, Mazzola was most highly regarded during his prime for his outstanding pace, acceleration, and stamina, as well as his dribbling ability, agility, technical skills, and balance, in particular when running at full speed while in possession of the ball; his pace, combined with his excellent ball control and technical ability enabled him to beat defenders frequently during matches, both in one-on-one situations or when undertaking individual runs. In addition to his ability as a footballer, Mazzola also stood out due to his personality, strong character, mentality, determination, and leadership.

Outside of football
On 3 July 1968, Mazzola founded the Italian Footballers' Association (AIC), in Milan, along with several fellow footballers, such as Giacomo Bulgarelli, Gianni Rivera, Ernesto Castano, Giancarlo De Sisti, and Giacomo Losi, as well as the recently retired Sergio Campana, also a lawyer, who was appointed president of the association.

He considers himself Roman Catholic.

Career statistics

Club

International

Honours

Inter Milan
Serie A: 1962–63, 1964–65, 1965–66, 1970–71
European Cup: 1963–64, 1964–65
Intercontinental Cup: 1964, 1965

Italy
FIFA World Cup runner-up: 1970
UEFA European Championship: 1968

Individual
Serie A top goal scorer: 1964–65 (17 goals)
European Cup top goal scorer: 1963–64 (alongside Vladica Kovačević of Partizan, and Ferenc Puskás of Real Madrid, with seven goals)
FIFA XI: 1967
UEFA European Championship Team of the Tournament: 1968
Ballon d'Or (2nd place): 1971
Italian Football Hall of Fame: 2014
Inter Milan Hall of Fame: 2022

References

External links

Sandro Mazzola: from tragedy to triumph at thesefootballtimes.co
 Inter Archive 

1942 births
Living people
Footballers from Turin
Italian footballers
Italy international footballers
Inter Milan players
Serie A players
1966 FIFA World Cup players
1970 FIFA World Cup players
1974 FIFA World Cup players
UEFA Euro 1968 players
UEFA European Championship-winning players
UEFA Champions League top scorers
Association football midfielders
Association football forwards
Italian Roman Catholics